Ayres Cerqueira Simão (born October 25, 1988), known as Simão Goiano, is a Brazilian football player, who last played for FC Dallas.

Career 

He began his football career at 12, playing well for Paraná. After five years he moved to Atletico Paranaense. He injured himself and his team released him, but after a year he came in Romania playing for FC Baia Mare.

He was the top scorer of his team and he was sold by FC Baia Mare to Liga I's Gloria Bistriţa. He made only one appearance for Gloria Bistriţa in Romanian First Division, Liga I. He substituted Ion Dumitra in the 86th minute of the away game against Rapid, in the 2nd day of the season. After those 4 minutes, he never appeared even on the substitutes' bench, being sent to the satellite team, in the third league.

He moved to Liga II team FC Botoşani, in the January 2008 transfer window. After three appearances as a substitute, he became starter for FC Botoşani, playing in 16 of the 17 second half of the season fixtures. He scored his first goal on April 5, in the away game against Dunarea Giurgiu, but scored just anotherone until the end of the season.

However, in the 2008-2009 season, he managed to score 5 goals in 20 appearances (about half of them as a substitute) for FC Botoşani. In July 2009, he moved to FCM Bacău, also in Liga II. He had a great start of the season, managing to score 4 goals in the first five league games.

External links
 
 
 
 

1988 births
Living people
Brazilian footballers
Paraná Clube players
Club Athletico Paranaense players
CS Minaur Baia Mare (football) players
ACF Gloria Bistrița players
FC Botoșani players
FCM Bacău players
Expatriate footballers in Romania
Liga I players
Liga II players
Association football forwards
Footballers from Curitiba